Raj Singh Arora is an Indian television actor, best known for his role as Yuvraj in the STAR One series Remix (2004). He played Mihir Arora in Ye Hai Mohabbatein (2013)

Personal life and career
Arora has been in a relationship with Pooja Gor since 2009. They separated in 2020, as confirmed by Gor in her Instagram post.

He started his career as a VJ and started making music videos. Arora made his acting debut in the TV serial Remix on STAR One. Arora is best known for the character Yuvraj Dev, also known as Yuvi, in the STAR One show Remix. He has recently appeared in the show on Channel V, V The Serial. He later starred as Ashu in the show Kahaani Ghar Ghar Kii, as Rattu in Four, and also appeared in an episode of Ek Thhi Naayka on Life OK and Yeh Hai Aashiqui . He starred in a few films such as Teri Meri Kahaani and Peter Gaya Kam Se. He portrayed Mihir Arora in the soap opera Ye Hai Mohabbatein from 2013-16.

Filmography

Television

Films

Awards & nominations

References

External links
 

Indian male television actors
Living people
Indian male models
21st-century Indian male actors
Year of birth missing (living people)